Fairfield, North Carolina may refer to:

Fairfield, Hyde County, North Carolina
Fairfield, Union County, North Carolina